Camp Half Moon is a co-ed sleepover camp on Lake Buel in Monterey, Massachusetts.

Camp Half Moon was established as a boys camp in 1922. The Mann family, originally from Lititz, Pennsylvania, currently own and operate Half Moon and purchased it from Dr. Ed Storey in 1967, who had owned and operated it for over 25 years. "Doc" Storey had been a history teacher in Pelham, New York, and many campers during the 1950s and 1960s came from Pelham and surrounding communities of southern Westchester County.
 
For many years a large number of the boys attending Half Moon came not only from the northeastern United States but also from all across Latin America. Within just a few years after the 1959 Cuban Revolution numerous families who escaped from the Communist takeover of the island and resettled in Puerto Rico were sending their sons to Half Moon to have a broader experience with American youngsters from the mainland. The camp is now for both boys and girls.

External links
Camp Half Moon

Half Moon
1922 establishments in Massachusetts
Buildings and structures in Berkshire County, Massachusetts